The 2019–20 Bangalore Super Division was the seventeenth season of the Bangalore Super Division which is the third tier of the Indian association football system and the top tier of the Karnataka football system. The season started on 2 November 2019. Bengaluru FC 'B' were the defending champions. All games were played at Bangalore Football Stadium. The league was contested by top 12 teams from 2018–19 season as well as Income Tax and AGORC who were promoted from 2018–19 Bangalore 'A' division. They replaced Jawahar Union and CIL who were relegated to 2019–20 Bangalore 'A' Division.

Bengaluru FC 'B' defended the title won in 2018–19 season. At the end of the season, Students Union and AGORC were relegated to 'A' Division.

Teams
Fourteen teams complete in the league.

Personnel and kits

Table

Results

Matches

Statistics

Hat-tricks

References

Bangalore Super Division seasons
4